Under the North Star is a trilogy published between 1959 and 1962  by Finnish author Väinö Linna.  The novel follows the life of a Finnish family from 1880, through the First World War, the Finnish Civil War and the Second World War,  to about 1950.   Through the lives of ordinary people, it describes the clash of ideals in Finland's language strife and the struggle between the Whites (nationalists) and the Reds (socialists) in the movement to Independence and Civil War.

Based on the work, two film adaptations directed by Edvin Laine have been made: the 1968 film Here, Beneath the North Star (based on the first and second volumes of trilogy) and it's the 1970 sequel Akseli and Elina (based on the third and final volume).

The novel shares  one main character, Akseli Koskela, and covers some of the same events as another novel: The Unknown Soldier  by the author.

Plot summary

Vol I: Under the North Star 
"In the beginning there were the swamp, the hoe – and Jussi", book starts, when the story opens with Jussi, a farm hand from Häme, clearing marshland to create a croft, which will later be called Koskela. In the first part of the book tension mounts between crofters and land owners. Jussi's son Akseli becomes an active socialist. At the same time the upper classes are concerned with language strife and Finland's relationship with Russia.

Vol II: The Uprising 
In the second part the Finnish Civil War breaks out. The book describes the atrocities committed on both sides, as well as the tensions which lead up to them. The war hits Koskela harshly, for the family loses two sons.

Vol III: Reconciliation 
In the third part the community is dominated by the whites, the victors of the Civil War. In Koskela, however, matters improve as crofters are liberated and Koskela becomes an independent farm. Things turn for the worse at the outbreak of the Second World War. Again Koskela pays a heavy price, losing three sons. The last chapters of the book concentrate on the reconciliatory atmosphere created by the joint hardships endured during the war.

Main characters

 Akseli Koskela, platoon leader in the Red Guard, later a farmer
 Elina Koskela, Akseli's wife
 Jussi Koskela, Akseli's father, tenant of the vicarage
 Alma Koskela, Akseli's mother and Jussi's wife
 Aleksi Koskela, Akseli's brother, Jussi and Alma's second son
 August Koskela, Akseli and Aleksi's brother, Jussi and Alma's third son.  (Aku for short)
 Adolf Halme, village tailor
 Lauri Salpakari, the local vicar and landlord of the Koskela Family
 Ellen Salpakari, Vicar Salpakari's wife, a conservative politician
 Otto Kivivuori, tenant farmer, Elina's father
 Anna Kivivuori, Otto's wife, Elina's mother
 Janne Kivivuori, Otto and Anna's eldest son, mason, socialist politician
 Oskari Kivivuori, Otto and Anna's youngest son, member of the Red Guard (Osku for short)
 Anttoo Laurila, tenant farmer
 Uuno Laurila, Anttoo's son, member of the Red Guard
 Elma Laurila, Anttoo's daughter, Akusti's fiancée
 Kalle Töyry, master of the Töyry House, landlord of the Laurila Family
 Artturi Yllö, judge and wealthy landowner
 Antero Mellola, very fat saw-mill owner
 Preeti Leppänen, tenant farmer
 Aune Leppänen, Preeti's daughter
 The Baron, owner of the Manor, landlord of the Leppänen Family
 The Baroness, The Baron's wife
 The Wolf-Kustaa, hunter and tramp

Impact
The book is considered a classic in Finland with print runs into hundreds of thousands. Even most of those who have not read the book are familiar with the iconic opening words "Alussa olivat suo, kuokka — ja Jussi" ("In the beginning there were the bog, the hoe — and Jussi"). It is a reference to two verses from the Bible, the opening sentence of the creation account, “In the beginning God created the heaven and the earth,” and the opening sentence of the Gospel of John, “In the beginning was the Word”.

The second book in the trilogy, The Uprising, generated considerable controversy over its portrayal of the Finnish Civil War because, for the first time, a novel was published that was sympathetic (in human terms, if not politically) towards the Reds.  Up until then, all history of the Finnish Civil War had been written by the Whites.  Under the North Star played a crucial role in starting a discussion in Finland over what really happened in 1918 and in healing decades-old wounds between the two factions.

Translations
Under the North Star has been translated into English by Richard Impola:
Vol. 1 Under the North Star pub. 2001, 
Vol. 2 Under the North Star 2: The Uprising pub. 2002, 
Vol. 3 Under the North Star 3: Reconciliation pub. 2003, 

Unfortunately these translated publications contain many typographical errors.

See also
 Väinö Linna
 Finnish Civil War
 History of Finland
 The Unknown Soldier
 The Unknown Soldier (1955 film)
 Edvin Laine
 Here, Beneath the North Star

Footnotes

External links

The Finnish Civil War as Depicted in Väinö Linna's Under the North Star
 Biography of Väinö Linna on: 100 Faces from Finland – a Biographical Kaleidoscope (retrieved: January 2013)
Books translated into English by Finnish American Translators Association (FATA)

Novel series
Historical novels by series
20th-century Finnish novels
Novels set in Finland
Family saga novels
Nordic Council's Literature Prize-winning works